The first table below details the complete World Championship Grand Prix results of the Formula One constructor Team Lotus between 1958 and 1994. The second table includes results from privately owned Lotus cars in World Championship Grands Prix between 1958 and 1979. The tables do not include results for the separate Team Lotus Formula One team of 2011 (which debuted in 2010 as "Lotus Racing"), the Lotus Renault GP team of 2011 or the Lotus F1 Team of 2012.

Complete Formula One World Championship results

Works team results
(key)
Notes
 Includes points scored by non-works cars.
† – The driver did not finish the Grand Prix, but was classified, as he completed over 90% of the race distance.
‡ – Half points awarded as less than 75% of the race distance was completed.

Results of other Lotus cars
(key)
* Asterisk indicates a race entered with an F2 car

Formula One constructor results
Lotus in motorsport